Tiegs is a surname. Notable people with the surname include:

Cheryl Tiegs (born 1947), American model and fashion designer
Oscar Werner Tiegs (1897–1956), Australian zoologist

See also
Infernus, stage name of Norwegian black metal musician Roger Tiegs (born 1972)